Aldo Leopold Wilderness, along with Gila Wilderness and Blue Range Wilderness, is part of New Mexico's Gila National Forest. The wilderness area lies along the crest of the Black Range.

The Continental Divide of the Americas and the Continental Divide Trail traverse part of the wilderness.

History

The area with the Aldo Leopold Wilderness was formerly part of the Gila Wilderness, the world's first wilderness area, established in 1924.  Later, the Gila was reduced in size and this area became the Black Range Primitive Area.  In 1980, the Aldo Leopold Wilderness was created, named after Aldo Leopold, a pioneering environmentalist.     

On September 18, 1879, the Apache war chief Victorio and his warriors ambushed 100 Buffalo soldiers (African-Americans) of the 9th Cavalry and Navajo scouts on the eastern edge of the Black Range and the Wilderness near Las Animas Creek. The Apaches killed about 10 of the Buffalo soldiers and Navajo scouts. The cavalry was able to withdraw after dark, leaving much of its gear to be captured by Apaches. The canyon where the battle took place is called "Massacre Canyon" and a nearby flat area is called Victorio Park.

Topography, flora, and fauna

The crest of the range overlooks a series of east-west trending steep and narrow stream valleys, one thousand or more feet deep. Hardwood forests, especially cottonwood, line many of the larger streams. 

The wilderness area has fauna typical of the American Southwest: mule deer, elk, spotted owl, gray fox, wild turkey, bobcat, peccary, black bear and cougar.  Of note is the effort to reintroduce the Mexican wolf to the region.  The native Gila trout has been brought back from the verge of extinction and now exists in small populations in Diamond Creek, South Diamond Creek and Black Canyon on the west side of the Black Range. A population of Rio Grande cutthroat trout survives in Holden Prong of Las Animas Creek on the east side of the Black Range.  The Mimbres River has its headwaters in the Wilderness.

Due to the prevalence of forest fires, brushy areas, grassland, and recently burned forests are also common.

Recreation

Aldo Leopold is rugged and remote and is often considered New Mexico's "wildest wilderness," probably seeing fewer human visitors in 2011 than it did 100 years ago.  Hiking and backpacking are the major recreational activities, but scarcity of water inhibits many potential visitors.  Most streams and springs are seasonal and unreliable.  More than 200 miles of trails crisscross the wilderness, including about 30 miles of the Continental Divide Trail.  Most trails are faint and little used and navigation can be a problem.  Scenery and solitude are the main attractions of the Aldo Leopold Wilderness. Hunting is permitted.

There are also a number of campgrounds, some with hiking trails, along NM 152 as it goes through Iron Canyon on the west side of the Black Range.

The Aldo Leopold is separated from the larger Gila Wilderness Area only by a gravel road and a narrow corridor of private property.

See also
Aldo Leopold
List of U.S. Wilderness Areas
Wilderness Act

References

External links
Aldo Leopold Wilderness - Wilderness.net
Aldo Leopold Wilderness Research Institute
Recreation - Wilderness - Gila National Forest
 Flora of the Aldo Leopold Wilderness & Gila National Forest

Protected areas of Catron County, New Mexico
Protected areas of Grant County, New Mexico
Great Divide of North America
IUCN Category Ib
Protected areas of Sierra County, New Mexico
Wilderness areas of New Mexico
Gila National Forest
Protected areas established in 1980
1980 establishments in New Mexico